The Kendall Island Migratory Bird Sanctuary (KIBS) is a migratory bird sanctuary in the Northwest Territories, Canada.  It is located on Kendall Island and its surrounding area in Mackenzie Bay at the northern tip of the Mackenzie River Delta. A seasonal sanctuary for more than 60,000 shorebirds. it is one of five bird sanctuaries within the Inuvialuit Settlement Region. The area that is now known as the KIBS is a traditional Inuvialuit whaling site.

The KIBS was established in 1961 to protect the breeding colony of lesser snow geese. Part of the Mackenzie River Delta, a key migratory bird terrestrial habitat site (NT Site 12), is located within the KIBS.

Geography
Several hills in the KIBS have upland terrain that has remained above water level since glaciation.  The ground in these hills is covered by sand or glacial till.

Natural resources
Two confirmed natural gas fields are located within the KIBS. The fields contain 4.8 trillion cubic feet of natural gas, representing more than half of the gas intended to fill the Mackenzie Valley Pipeline.

Wildlife
KIBS is frequented from May through October by more than 90 bird species, including many migrating waterfowl. Compared to other Key Habitat Sites in Northern Canada, particularly high densities of Arctic tern, greater white-fronted goose, loon, northern pintail, and sandhill crane frequent the area. Tundra swan concentrate around the outer section of the MBS. A colony of approximately 3000 lesser snow geese have been identified at KIBS, as well as nationally significant numbers of Hudsonian godwit and whimbrel. The short-eared owl, a Species at Risk Act-listed bird, has been records at KIBS, as well as grizzly bear, polar bear and wolverine, which are listed species by Canada's Committee on the Status of Endangered Wildlife, and the highly endangered Eskimo curlew. The Lapland longspur appears to be avoiding the KIBS because of seismic lines and drilling pads brought on by natural gas exploration.

References

Migratory Bird Sanctuaries of Canada
Important Bird Areas of the Northwest Territories
Parks in the Northwest Territories
Inuvik Region
Protected areas in the Inuvialuit Settlement Region